Elise Paschen (born January 1959) is an American poet and member of the Osage Nation. She is the co-founder and co-editor of Poetry in Motion, a program which places poetry posters in subways and buses across the country.

Career and education
The daughter of renowned prima ballerina Maria Tallchief and Chicago contractor Henry D. Paschen, she was born and raised in Chicago, Illinois, where she attended the Francis W. Parker School. Paschen is a member of the Osage Nation.

While an undergraduate at Harvard University, Paschen received the Lloyd McKim Garrison Medal for poetry, and served as Poetry Editor of the Harvard Advocate.  At Oxford University, where she received her M.Phil. and D.Phil. degrees in 20th Century British and American Literature, she co-founded and co-edited Oxford Poetry. 

Executive Director of the Poetry Society of America from 1988 until 2001, she has edited numerous anthologies, including the New York Times bestsellers Poetry Speaks. Her books of poetry include, most recently, The Nightlife, as well as Bestiary, Infidelities, winner of the Nicholas Roerich Poetry Prize, and Houses: Coasts. Her poems have been published in numerous magazines and anthologies including The New Yorker, Poetry and The Best American Poetry 2018.

Paschen teaches in the MFA Writing Program at the School of the Art Institute of Chicago. She lives in Chicago with her husband, Stuart Brainerd, and their two children.

Awards

 Nicholas Roerich Poetry Prize, for Infidelities
 Lloyd McKim Garrison Medal for poetry
 Joan Grey Untermyer Poetry Prize
 Richard Selig Poetry Prize
 Frances C. Allen Fellowship

Works
 Houses: Coasts (Sycamore Press, Oxford, 1985)
 Infidelities (Story Line Press, 1996)
 Bestiary (Red Hen Press, 2009)
The Nightlife (Red Hen Press, 2017)

Anthologies featuring her poems
 Reinventing the Enemy’s Language: Contemporary Native Women’s Writings of North America (1997)
 Ravishing DisUnities: Real Ghazals in English (2000)
 The POETRY Anthology, 1912—2002 (2002)
 A Formal Feeling Comes: Poems in Form by Contemporary Women (2007)
 Ghost Fishing: An Eco-Justice Poetry Anthology (University of Georgia Press, 2018)

Editor or co-editor
 Poetry in Motion (1996)
 Poetry Speaks (2001)
 Poetry in Motion from Coast to Coast (2002)
 Poetry Speaks to Children (2005)
 Poetry Speaks Expanded (2007)
 Poetry Speaks Who I Am (2010)

Notes

External links
 Elise Paschen author homepage
 Elise Paschen on NativeWiki.
 Elise Paschen on Twitter.
https://www.poetryfoundation.org/poets/elise-paschen

1959 births
Living people
20th-century American women writers
21st-century American women writers
20th-century Native Americans
21st-century Native Americans
Alumni of the University of Oxford
American women poets
Art Institute of Chicago
Harvard University alumni
Native American poets
Native American women writers
Osage people
Writers from Chicago
20th-century Native American women
21st-century Native American women

Francis W. Parker School (Chicago) alumni